HD 69830 (285 G. Puppis) is a yellow dwarf star located  away in the constellation of Puppis. In 2005, the Spitzer Space Telescope discovered a narrow ring of warm debris orbiting the star. The debris ring contains substantially more dust than the Solar System's asteroid belt. In 2006, three extrasolar planets with minimum masses comparable to Neptune were confirmed in orbit around the star, located interior to the debris ring.

Distance and visibility 

HD 69830 is a main sequence star of spectral type G8V. It has about 86% of the Sun's mass, 90% of its radius, 62% of its luminosity, and 89% of its iron abundance. The star's age has been estimated at about 10.6 ± 4 billion years. HD 69830 is located about 40.7 light-years from the Sun, lying in the northeastern part of the constellation of Puppis (the Poop Deck). It can be seen east of Sirius, southwest of Procyon, northeast of Delta Canis Majoris, and north of Zeta Puppis.

Planetary system

Planets 

On May 17, 2006, a team of astronomers using the European Southern Observatory's (ESO) HARPS spectrograph on the 3.6-metre La Silla telescope in the Atacama desert, Chile, announced the discovery of three extrasolar planets orbiting the star.  With minimum masses between 10 and 18 times that of the Earth, all three planets are presumed to be similar to the planets Neptune or Uranus.  , no planet with more than half the mass of Jupiter had been detected within three astronomical units of HD 69830.

The star rotates at an inclination of 13 degrees relative to Earth. It has been assumed that the planets share that inclination. However b and c are "hot Neptunes", and outside this system several are now known to be oblique relative to the stellar axis.

The outermost planet discovered appears to be within the system's habitable zone, where liquid water would remain stable (more accurate data on the primary star's luminosity will be required to know for sure where the habitable zone is).  HD 69830 is the first extrasolar planetary system around a Sun-like star without any known planets comparable to Jupiter or Saturn in mass.

The planetary parameters were updated in 2023.

Debris disk 

In 2005, the Spitzer Space Telescope detected a debris disk in the HD 69830 system consistent with being produced by an asteroid belt twenty times more massive than that in our own system. The belt was originally thought to be located inside an orbit equivalent to that of Venus in the Solar System, which would place it between the orbits of the second and third planets. The disk contains sufficient quantities of dust that the nights on any nearby planets would be lit up by zodiacal light 1000 times brighter than that seen on Earth, easily outshining the Milky Way.

Further analysis of the spectrum of the dust revealed that it is composed of highly processed material, likely derived from a disrupted C-type asteroid of at least 30 km radius which contained many small olivine-rich (rocky) and once-wet grains which would not survive at close distances to the star. Instead, it seems more likely that the asteroid belt producing the dust is located outside the orbit of the outermost planet, around 1 AU from the star. This region contains the 2:1 and 5:2 mean motion resonances with HD 69830 d.

Gallery

In Fiction 

 In the first-person shooter videogame franchise Halo, the homeworld of the enemy alien species Kig-Yar is a moon orbiting within the HD 69830 system, with the system being known as "Y'Deio" and the moon being called Eayn.

See also 
 HD 169830
 HD 40307
 HD 60532
 List of extrasolar planets

References

External links 

 
 
 
 
 
 Extrasolar Planet Interactions by Rory Barnes & Richard Greenberg, Lunar and Planetary Lab, University of Arizona

 
G-type main-sequence stars
Puppis, 285
040693
3259
69830
Durchmusterung objects
0302
Planetary systems with three confirmed planets
J08182389-1237541